Eucarterus sparsutus is a species of beetle in the family Carabidae, the only species in the genus Eucarterus.

References

Harpalinae